Agriculture in Kyrgyzstan is a significant sector of the economy. According to the CIA World Factbook, it comprises 18% of the total GDP and occupies 48% of the total labor force. Only 6.8% of the total land area is used for crop cultivation, but 44% of the land is used as pastures for livestock. Because of the many mountains of Kyrgyzstan, animal husbandry remains a significant part of the agricultural economy.

Cultivation is centered in the Fergana Valley, Talas Region, and Chüy Region.

Among Kyrgyzstan's agricultural products are tobacco, cotton, potatoes, vegetables, grapes, fruits, and berries. As far as total production, the largest crop is assorted types of animal fodder to feed the livestock of the country. The second largest crop is winter wheat, followed by barley, corn, and rice.

Significant animal derived products include sheep, goats, cattle, and wool. Chickens, horses, and pigs are also present. In some regions, yaks are herded and bred.

Of these, the top products for export are cotton and tobacco. Meat is also exported, but in less significant quantities. However, the country has over 9 million hectares of pasture and a favourable environment for the development of animal husbandry. Recently Kyrgyzstan concluded accords to export meat to Saudi Arabia from September, 2012.

Production
Kyrgyzstan produced in 2018:

 1.4 million tons of potato;
 773 thousand tons of sugar beet;
 692 thousand tons of maize;
 615 thousand tons of wheat;
 429 thousand tons of barley;
 224 thousand tons of tomato;
 218 thousand tons of watermelon;
 209 thousand tons of onion;
 176 thousand tons of carrot;
 147 thousand tons of cabbage;
 144 thousand tons of apple;
 119 thousand tons of cucumber;
 116 thousand tons of vegetable;
 101 thousand tons of bean;
 74 thousand tons of cotton;

In addition to smaller productions of other agricultural products, like apricot (25 thousand tons).

Corruption in the Tobacco Industry

In 2010, AOI-Kyrgyzstan, a Kyrgyz subsidiary of Alliance One International Inc., a global tobacco leaf merchant headquartered in North Carolina, United States, pleaded guilty to violations of the Foreign Corrupt Practices Act (FCPA), relating to bribes paid to Kyrgyzstan government officials in connection with its purchase of Kyrgyz tobacco.

Alliance One was formed from a merger between Dimon Incorporated and Standard Commercial Corporation in 2005. AOI-Kyrgyzstan admitted that employees of Dimon’s Kyrgyz subsidiary paid a total of approximately US$3 million in bribes from 1996 to 2004 to various officials in the Republic of Kyrgyzstan, including officials of the Kyrgyz Tamekisi, a government entity that controlled and regulated the tobacco industry in Kyrgyzstan. Bribes totalling US$254,262 were made to five local provincial government officials, known as "Akims", to obtain permission to purchase tobacco from local growers during the same period.

There was also significant incidence of child labor in the tobacco industry. In fact, the 2013 U.S. Department of Labor report on the worst forms of child labor indicated that 4.5% of children aged 5 to 14 were engaged in such working conditions in tobacco cultivation, and that despite the availability of education, evidence suggested that "a limited number of schools required children to harvest tobacco on school grounds". Despite adopting an action plan for the National Program against Human Trafficking for 2013-2016, "interagency coordination on child labor continued to be poor", according to the report. More recently in December 2014, the Department's List of Goods Produced by Child Labor or Forced Labor reported tobacco as a good still produced by Kyrgyz children, among others. To tobacco, the list added cotton, the cultivation of which was determined by national law as hazardous.

Organic farming
The organic movement began in Kyrgyzstan in 2004. At that time, 34 pioneer farmers were engaged in it. Today, Bio Farmer unites more than a thousand certified farmers and offers organic products such as cotton, sunflower seeds, beans, medical and aromatic plants, and dried apricots. According to experts, organic farming is most suitable to countries with generally small farms, cheap labor and a shortage of capital. Thus, organic farming may become Kyrgyzstan’s perfect future. In fact, the Kyrgyzstan Parliament just announced a plan to phase out all non-organic farming and switch to 100% organic agriculture by 2028.

See also
Agriculture in Central Asia
Belarusian agricultural machines for Kyrgyz farmers

Sources

Animal Husbandry in Kyrgyzstan
Agriculture in Kyrgyzstan

References